The MNL-2 is the second-tier football league of Myanmar. The official name is MNL-2 League. The inaugural season began in 2013.

History
The MNL-2 was founded in 2013 as part of MFF's effort to extend competitiveness into the nation's football system. 
The league is played in a league cup format. After two rounds of competition, the top two teams compete each other for the final. The two finalists are promoted to the MNL. The top four finishers from the league also qualify for the MFF Cup. However, this rule does not apply to the two guest teams which are taking part on experimental purposes.

For the inaugural season in 2013, nine teams participated.  Among them, Best United and Horizon FC were transformed from former Futsal clubs. Mawyawadi FC and Chin United were relegated from the MNL at the end of the 2012 season while Myawady FC were promoted from the Amateur League. Pong Gan FC is a new club, founded in 2014.

The 2015 MNL-2 winner was Southern Myanmar and 1st runner-up was Horizon FC.

In the 2016 MNL-2 season, four new clubs were included. Three clubs will qualify to MNL-2.

In the 2018 MNL-2 season, Mountain Lion included in competition.

Promotion and relegation 
The top two teams will be promoted to the Myanmar National League. The top team as champions.

Champions history

Awards

Top scorers

References

External links
MNL-2 New Holland League
Asean Football Federation
Myanmar National League
Soccer Myanmar

 
2
Second level football leagues in Asia
Sports leagues established in 2013